Alpe du Grand Serre is a ski resort located in the French Dauphine Alps in Isère département, upon the commune of La Morte, sitting at 1368m. The village itself is located at the summit of a mountain pass at the gates of the Oisans valley, between the Romanche valley and the Roizonne valley. Neighbouring mountains are the Taillefer (2857m) and the Grand Serre summit (2141m). It remains a small mountain village with traditional alpine buildings and atmosphere. Thus, it is mostly visited by local people and families from the Grenoble urban area.

History
The ski resort has been created in 1938 in the village of "La Morte". Its name changed to Alpe du Grand Serre in the 1960s with the build of the Petit Mollard lift. Today, the skiable area represents some 220 hectares, based upon 14 lifts. Having been historically ruled by the commune of La Morte, the ski resort of Alpe du Grand Serre has been managed since 2001 by société d'aménagement touristique Alpe d'Huez grand domaine (S.A.T.A.).

Technical characteristics
Skilifts :
3 chair lifts;
9 surface lifts;

See also

Commune of La Morte

Notes

External links
(fr) Site officiel de l'Alpe du Grand Serre
(fr) Site officiel de la S.A.T.A. 

Ski stations in France
Tourist attractions in Isère
Sports venues in Isère